Coloring Book is the fourth extended play by the American post-hardcore band Glassjaw, self-released on February 13, 2011. The release was initially exclusively given away for free during the group's February–March 2011 tour, and was said to serve as a preview for Glassjaw's upcoming third studio album. The EP was later made available on Glassjaw's webstore on October 1, 2012, packaged in a red gatefold sleeve along with a pink-colored DVD, Coloring Book: Live at the Forum.

A limited edition 12" vinyl pressing of the EP was released on August 13, 2013. Each disc is unique in that they were made up of three rings, each in different colors, thus meaning no two copies are the same. The 12" edition was limited to 120 pieces.

Track listing

Personnel
Glassjaw
 Daryl Palumbo – lead vocals
 Justin Beck – guitars, keys
 Durijah Lang – drums, percussion
 Manuel Carrero – bass

Production and recording
 Ryan Seigel – production
 Jonathan Florencio – production
 Samuel Vaughan Merrick IV – mixing

References

Glassjaw EPs
2011 EPs
Self-released EPs